Harpella is a genus of fungi in the Harpellaceae family. The widespread genus contains five species that grow in Diptera.

References

External links

Zygomycota genera